The Justice League  is a team of superheroes appearing in American comic books published by DC Comics. The team first appeared in The Brave and the Bold #28 (March 1960). The team was conceived by writer Gardner Fox as a revival of the Justice Society of America, a similar team from DC Comics from the 1940s which had been pulled out of print due to a decline in sales.

The Justice League is an all-star ensemble cast of established superhero characters from DC Comics' portfolio. Diegetically, these superheroes usually operate independently but occasionally assemble as a team to tackle especially formidable villains. This is in contrast to certain other superhero teams such as the X-Men, whose characters were created specifically to be part of the team, with the team being central to their identity. The cast of the Justice League usually features a few highly popular characters who have their own solo books, such as Superman, Batman and Wonder Woman alongside a number of lesser-known characters who benefit from exposure. The Justice League was created to boost the profiles and sales of said characters through cross-promotion and helped develop the DC Universe as a shared universe, as it is through teams like the Justice League that the setting's characters regularly interact with each other.

Beyond comic books, the Justice League has been adapted to a number of television shows, films, and video games included.

Fictional overview

Members

The members of the Justice League are heroes who normally operate independently but who occasionally team up to tackle especially formidable villains. This is in contrast to teams such as the X-Men or the Fantastic Four, who normally operate as a team and for whom the team is central to their identity.

Most versions of the Justice League feature a select cast of highly popular characters from the DC Comics portfolio, such as Superman, Batman and Wonder Woman, to attract readers with their star power; and they often co-feature a few lesser-known characters who benefit from exposure, such as Cyborg or Black Canary. DC Comics has in several periods deviated from this formula, most notably in the late 1980s and early 1990s with books such as Justice League International, which deliberately featured a cast of lesser-known characters. The advantage of this was that lesser-known characters are not burdened by convoluted continuities, which gives writers more creative flexibility to write character-driven stories. This was done to emulate the model of Marvel Comics' X-Men comic books, whose stories were more character-driven and which favored more obscure or even new characters.

The Justice League is an independent group, although it usually accepts some constraints from the U.S. government or the United Nations so as to receive their sanction. Particularly in the early decades of publication, DC Comics was keen for its superheroes to be perceived as law-abiding because children were the main audience. The cast is rarely more than a dozen people in size so as to give a reasonable and equal time for each character. While sometimes the League is shown to have a designated chairperson or leader, there is otherwise no hierarchy; they are a small band of equals who make major decisions, such as inducting new members, by vote.

Headquarters
The Justice League operates out of a headquarters. In the 1960s, their headquarters was secretly in a hollowed-out mountain outside the fictional town of Happy Harbor in Rhode Island. In Justice League of America #78 (1970), they moved to a satellite. In the Super Friends cartoons which ran from 1973 to 1985, they operated out of the "Hall of Justice" located in Washington, D.C. During the brief "Justice League Detroit" era, they were headquartered in a repurposed bomb shelter in Detroit. In the JLA comic book which ran from 1997 to 2006, their headquarters was on the Moon and called "the Watchtower". The centerpiece of the headquarters is a conference table around which the Justice League discusses menaces to deal with. The satellite and Moon base headquarters are equipped with teleporters for those members who cannot fly to it.

Villains
The Legion of Doom was created for the  Challenge of the Super Friends animated TV series as a villainous counterpart to the Justice League. In that original incarnation, it consisted of established villains associated with each of the Justice League's members; e.g., Lex Luthor for Superman, Gorilla Grodd for the Flash, and the Cheetah for Wonder Woman. The Legion of Doom, or some variant of it, has since appeared in other TV shows and comic books.

Comic books
Since 1960, the Justice League has appeared in comic books published by DC Comics (periodicals and graphic novels). These comic books constitute the bulk of Justice League fiction.

Silver Age and Bronze Age (1960–1984)

In its inception, the Justice League was a revival of the Justice Society of America, created by editor Sheldon Mayer and writer Gardner Fox in 1940. After World War II, superheroes fell out of popularity, which led to the cancellation of many characters, including the Justice Society, which last appeared in All-Star Comics #57 (1951). A few years later, sales rose again, and DC Comics revived some of these retired characters, reinventing a few of them in the process. Editor Julius Schwartz asked writer Gardner Fox to reintroduce the Justice Society of America. Schwartz decided to rename it the "Justice League of America" because he felt "League" would appeal better to young readers, evoking sports organizations such as the National League. The Justice League of America debuted in The Brave and the Bold #28 (March 1960), and after two further appearances in that title, got its own series, which quickly became one of the company's best-selling titles. This led DC Comics to create a bunch of other superhero teams, such as the Teen Titans. Marvel Comics, a rival comic book publisher, noticed the Justice League's success and created the Avengers and the Fantastic Four.

The initial Justice League lineup included seven of DC Comics' superheroes who were regularly published at that time: Superman, Batman, Aquaman, the Flash, Green Lantern, the Martian Manhunter, and Wonder Woman. Fox also created a new, non-superhero character called Snapper Carr that was intended to represent DC's teenaged readership and joined the League as an Honorary member in their debut story. While Superman and Batman were included in the Justice League's initial lineup, they were largely absent from the League's early stories, playing only minor roles as the pair were already starring together in DC's World's Finest Comics and Fox was worried the two more famous heroes would detract attention from their less popular teammates. As the series went on however, Superman and Batman became more and more present as readers increasingly demanded to see more of them in the League's stories. The team roster would quickly expand with the Green Arrow, the Atom and Hawkman being added to the team over the next four years.

In the Justice Society stories from the 1940s (in All-Star Comics), the Justice Society was used more as a framing device for its members' solo adventures. The stories tended to have the following structure: the Justice Society meets to discuss some new menace, they split up to undertake individual missions that somehow connect to said menace, and finally regroup for the showdown with the main villain. In the 1940s, most comic books were anthologies, and All-Star Comics was in practice not a major deviation from that. By contrast, the Justice League worked together more closely in their stories, thereby having a stronger identity as a team.

In another change from the Justice Society stories of the 1940s, Batman and Superman were regular members of the cast, not mere "honorary members" who made occasional cameos.

Justice League of America #21 (1963) featured the first crossover story in which the Justice League meets and teams up with the Justice Society of America. In doing so, DC Comics brought back a number of legacy characters such as Doctor Fate and the Black Canary. The issue was a hit with readers and such crossovers became a recurring event.

Detroit era (1984–1986)
From the Justice League's inception in 1960 up until 1984, the team's roster always included a number of A-list characters to draw in readers, such as Wonder Woman and Superman. But in Justice League of America Annual #2 (1984), the Justice League was revised to entirely comprise more obscure characters, such as Vixen, Vibe, and the Martian Manhunter. The original A-list members would not be brought back into the cast until 1996. The motives behind this change were to dispense with the convoluted continuities of the classic characters by using lesser-known and new characters, thus giving the writers more flexibility to write character-driven stories; and to give the team a more youthful, hipper feel similar to that of the Teen Titans and the X-Men, which were selling better. The cast was multicultural: Gypsy was Romani, Vibe was Latino, Vixen was Black. However, the writing of Vibe and Gypsy was criticized for using clichés of their ethnic groups, symptomatic of writers who were well-meaning but out of touch, something for which said writers (Gerry Conway and Chuck Patton) later expressed regret. This era of the Justice League, which lasted about two years, is popularly known as "Justice League Detroit" because they were headquartered in Detroit.

Justice League International and its spin-offs (1986–1996)

The 1986 company-wide crossover "Legends" concluded with the formation of a new Justice League. The new team was dubbed the "Justice League," then "Justice League International" (JLI) and was given a mandate with less of an American focus. The Justice League International was recognized by the United Nations as a political entity and established "embassies" all over the world. The new series was character-driven and had a quirky, humorous tone which proved popular with readers. Numerous spin-off teams such as Justice League Europe/Extreme Justice and Justice League Task Force were created. In 1996, these series were cancelled due to low sales.

The Justice League International featured characters that had previously not been part of the DC Universe, which had been absorbed from the portfolios of other publishers that DC Comics had purchased. These included Captain Atom and the Blue Beetle, which were created for Charlton Comics in the 1960s. In 1983, DC Comics purchased Charlton Comics and, a few years later, integrated the Blue Beetle and Captain Atom into the DC Universe. Captain Marvel, originally from the Fawcett Comics universe, was similarly integrated.

JLA (1996–2006)
The cancellation of the aforementioned spin-off books prompted DC to revamp the League as a single team in a single title. A new Justice League of America was launched in a September 1996 miniseries Justice League: A Midsummer's Nightmare by Mark Waid and Fabian Nicieza, which returned to the classic cast. In 1997, DC Comics launched a new book titled JLA. Grant Morrison wrote JLA for the first four years, and they gave the book an epic feel by making the Justice League an allegory for a pantheon of gods, and in their stories they regularly fought villains who threatened the entire world or even the entire cosmos. JLA was cancelled in 2006.

Modern Age (2006–present)
The Justice League books more or less continued the trend set by the JLA era: world-shaking threats with epic stakes, with a focus on plot over character development, and strong tie-ins to all the company's crossover events. In The New 52 era, the continuity was changed to make Cyborg, one of DC's premiere African American heroes, a founding member of the team.

DC Comics also released a sister title called Justice League Dark, which is an ensemble team of prominent magic users of the DC Universe, such as John Constantine and Zatanna.

Inter-company crossovers
The Justice League has on a few occasions appeared in crossover stories with superhero characters from rival publishers such as Marvel Comics and Dark Horse Comics. In general, such inter-company crossovers are rare because a lot of resources must be spent in sorting out the legal issues and corporate politics of the two companies, and due to licensing issues, they cannot create spin-off merchandise and media, which all reduce the profitability of such projects.

The last crossover between DC Comics and Marvel Comics was JLA/Avengers, which they jointly published in 2003. Now that Marvel Comics and DC Comics are part of major multimedia corporations (Disney and Warner Brothers, respectively), those aforementioned hurdles are even more complicated, which makes another project like JLA/Avengers much less likely. In 2017, Dan Didio remarked that DC Comics and Marvel are very competitive towards each other and only did crossovers when their sales were low. However, DC Comics did go on to feature the Justice League in crossovers with smaller companies such as Dark Horse Comics, such as a crossover with Black Hammer in 2019.

In other media

Animated movies
The Justice League appears in Justice League: The New Frontier (2008), an adaptation of Darwyn Cooke's graphic novel DC: The New Frontier.
The team appears in Justice League: Crisis on Two Earths (2010). The movie was based on an unused script for a never-made movie that was to bridge the TV shows Justice League and Justice League Unlimited.
An alternate version of the Justice League appears in Justice League: Gods and Monsters (2015). In this movie, Superman is the son of General Zod, Wonder Woman is the New God Bekka, and Batman is essentially the Man-Bat. This Justice League, while ultimately heroic, is more ruthless than the traditional Justice League. Along with the film, a three-part animated series entitled Justice League: Gods and Monsters Chronicles was released before the film on Machinima.
The team appears in Justice League: The Flashpoint Paradox, an animated adaptation of the Flashpoint graphic novel.
The team are prominently featured in following movies set in the DC Animated Movie Universe:
Justice League: War (2014)
Justice League: Throne of Atlantis (2015)
Justice League vs. Teen Titans (2016)
Justice League Dark (2017)
The Death of Superman (2018)
Reign of the Supermen (2019)
Justice League Dark: Apokolips War (2020)
The Justice League appears in the computer-animated film DC League of Super-Pets (2022).

Animated TV shows

In 1967, CBS aired three animated shorts titled "Justice League of America" as part of The Superman/Aquaman Hour of Adventure. The cast featured Aquaman, the Flash, Superman, the Atom, Green Lantern, and Hawkman.
The team appear in Super Friends. Super Friends is an American animated television series about the Justice League, which ran from 1973 to 1986 on ABC as part of its Saturday morning cartoon lineup. It was produced by Hanna-Barbera and was based on the Justice League of America (JLA) and associated comic book characters published by DC Comics. There were a total of 109 episodes preceded by two backdoor pilot episodes of The New Scooby-Doo Movies.
An animated television series titled Justice League ran from 2001 to 2006 on Cartoon Network. It is part of the DC animated universe. The show was produced by Warner Bros. Animation. It is based on the Justice League of America and associated comic book characters published by DC Comics. After the second season, the series name changed to Justice League Unlimited.
Another series titled Justice League Action was also released. It  is an American animated television series based on the DC Comics superhero team of the same name. The series is produced by Jim Krieg, Butch Lukic, and Alan Burnett. This show debuted on Cartoon Network UK on November 26, 2016, and premiered in the United States on Cartoon Network on December 16, 2016.
The Justice League make minor appearances in the adult animated web television series Harley Quinn.

Live action TV
A proto-Justice League lineup is featured in Smallville, first appearing in the episode "Justice" of the show's sixth season. The group initially consists of Clark Kent, Bart Allen, Arthur Curry, Victor Stone, Oliver Queen, Chloe Sullivan and Dinah Lance; in the show's comic book continuation Smallvile: Continuity, an assemblage more familiar to the Justice League in most other media is formed, including Martian Manhunter, Hawkman, Stargirl, Tess Mercer, Supergirl, Booster Gold, Batman, Wonder Woman and Green Lantern.
The Justice League are mentioned in the first season of Titans during a conversation between Dick Grayson and Donna Troy during flashbacks.
At the end of the Arrowverse crossover Crisis on Infinite Earths, the heroes of the newly created Earth-Prime gather at an abandoned S.T.A.R. Labs building and around a table; forming a team to defend their new world following a memorial for Oliver Queen / Green Arrow, who gave his life to save the multiverse. While never referred to as the Justice League, this group consists of White Canary, The Flash, Supergirl, Batwoman, Superman, Black Lightning and Martian Manhunter, with an empty seat in honor of Oliver.
 The Justice League makes a cameo appearance in the first-season finale of Peacemaker (2022), set in the DCEU, with the group consisting of Wonder Woman, Flash, Superman and Aquaman.

Live action movies
 Batman, Superman and Wonder Woman appear together in Batman v Superman: Dawn of Justice (2016), although not as a formal team. The Flash, Aquaman, and Cyborg make cameo appearances.
 The team then formally appears in Justice League (2017), which was the sequel to Batman v Superman.  In 2021, Warner Brothers released a director's cut edition of the movie, which added a cameo by the Martian Manhunter.

The Justice League is referenced in several other movies that are part of the DC Extended Universe setting, which includes Suicide Squad, Shazam!, Black Adam, Shazam! Fury of the Gods.

Cultural impact
Most of the characters that appear in DC Comics' books are set in the same fictional universe, known as the DC Universe. They occasionally make guest appearances in each other's solo books, and more regularly in team books such as Justice League. Such crossovers encouraged readers to buy other books in DC Comics' catalogue, and readers became engrossed not just in the individual characters but in their web of relationships across the broader setting, thereby building brand loyalty. Marvel Comics copied this idea by creating a number of superhero teams of its own, the closest analogue being the Avengers, so as to promote and develop the Marvel Universe. Many readers devoted themselves to just one of these two comic book universes, as they were both large and did not overlap; thus, the superhero fan community developed sub-communities of DC and Marvel devotees.

Collected editions

Silver Age Justice League of America

This series has been collected in the following volumes:

* Omitted issues that featured reprints of material from earlier volumes

Also collected in DC Omnibuses:

Justice League/Justice League International/Justice League America (1987–1996)

This series has been collected in the following collections (there are hardcover and trade paperback versions of all volumes):

JLA (1997–2006)

This series has been collected in the following trade paperbacks:

This series has also been collected in the following Grant Morrison-centric hardcover collections:

DC Deluxe Edition trade paperbacks

Justice League of America (vol. 2) (2006–2011)

This series has been collected in the following hardcover collections:

The New 52

DC Rebirth

DC Universe Justice League (vol. 4) (2018–present)

Miscellaneous reprints

These trades reprint themed issues.

Awards
The original Justice League of America series won two 1961 Alley Awards in the categories "Best Comic Book" and "Best Adventure-Hero Group." In 1963, the series won "Favorite Novel" ("Crisis on Earth-One/Crisis on Earth-Two" in Justice League of America #21–22 by Gardner Fox and Mike Sekowsky) and "Strip that Should Be Improved." There also an award specific to the series, "Artist Preferred on Justice League of America," that was won by Murphy Anderson.

Theme park attractions

Justice League: Alien Invasion 3D
 

Justice League: Alien Invasion is an interactive dark ride at Warner Bros. Movie World on the Gold Coast, Australia. In the ride, guests board vehicles equipped with blasters as they join the Justice League in the fight against Starro, who has mind-controlled the citizens of Metropolis.

Justice League: Battle for Metropolis 

Justice League: Battle for Metropolis is an interactive dark ride at seven Six Flags parks across the United States and Mexico. In the ride, Lex Luthor and the Joker have captured Supergirl, Wonder Woman, Green Lantern, and Flash, and it is up to the combined forces of the remaining members of the Justice League and the Justice League Reserve Team to save them from their capture at LexCorp. Guests board motion-enhanced and stun blaster-equipped vehicles designed by A.R.G.U.S. as they ride through Metropolis and join the fight against the henchmen of Lex Luthor and the Joker.

See also
List of Justice League collected editions

 Justice Society of America
 Avengers

Affiliations and spin-off groups
 Extreme Justice
 Justice League 3000
 Justice League Beyond
 Justice League Dark
 Justice League Elite
 Justice League Europe
 Justice League International
 Justice League Queer
 Justice League Task Force
 Justice League United
 Justice Leagues
 Legion of Super-Heroes
 Legion of Super-Pets
 Super Buddies
 Super Friends
 Green Lantern Corps
 Teen Titans
 Young Justice

Notes

References

Sources

External links

 Justice League at DC Comics.com
 Justice League of America at Don Markstein's Toonopedia WebCitation Archive
 The Justice League Library
 

 
1960 comics debuts
1997 comics debuts
2006 comics debuts
2011 comics debuts
2016 comics debuts
2018 comics debuts
Batman characters
Characters created by Gardner Fox
Comics by Brad Meltzer
Comics by Geoff Johns
Comics by Grant Morrison
Comics by Keith Giffen
Comics by Jim Lee
Comics by Steve Englehart
DC Comics adapted into films
DC Comics superhero teams
DC Comics titles
Flash (comics) characters
Superman characters
Wonder Woman characters